Mercury 13 is a 2018 documentary film about the Mercury 13, thirteen American woman pilots who in 1960 took and passed the same tests given the previous year to the Mercury 7, the astronauts selected by NASA for Project Mercury.

Critical reception 
The site's consensus reads: "Mercury 13 offers yet another sobering example of how institutionalized sexism has thwarted countless dreams -- and held nations back from their full potential."

See also
List of films with a 100% rating on Rotten Tomatoes

References

External links

2018 films
2018 documentary films
Netflix original documentary films
Documentary films about the space program of the United States
+
Documentary films about women
2010s English-language films